PS: The Preventive Maintenance Monthly is a series of United States Army technical bulletins published since June 1951 as a monthly magazine with comic book-style art to illustrate proper preventive maintenance methods. The magazine's title derives from its being a "postscript" to technical manuals and other published maintenance guidance.

Origin – Army Motors magazine
The Army had experienced some degree of acceptance and success during the Second World War with the instructional publication Army Motors, for which Corporal Will Eisner, an established comic-book writer-artist-editor, had been appropriated to draw such characters as Beetle Bailey-like Private Joe Dope, Lauren Bacall look-alike and "by the book" Corporal Connie Rodd, and Master Sergeant Half-Mast McCanick. Eisner left the Army as a chief warrant officer to start American Visuals Corporation, a contract graphic art company. In response to a sudden need for maintenance instruction at the start of the Korean War, the Army contracted American Visuals Corporation to create instructional material, similar to Eisner's work on Army Motors for the Army Ordnance Corps's new publication, PS, The Preventive Maintenance Monthly, that replaced Army Motors in 1951.

Production of PS

Eisner was the publication's artistic director from its inception through the end of 1971. The magazine's artists have included Eisner, Murphy Anderson, Joe Kubert, Dan Spiegle, Scott Madsen, Malane Newman, Alfredo Alcala, and Mike Ploog. The magazine from its inception has been, written, researched and edited by Department of the Army civilians.

The magazine is published in digest size with 2-color spots and a four-color cover and continuity. The continuity consists of a short story told through the use of a series of panels like any comic book, often with a theme borrowed from popular fiction. The home office of PS was located at Aberdeen Proving Ground, Maryland, from April 1951 until January 1955, when it was moved to Raritan Arsenal, New Jersey. It was moved again in October 1962 to Fort Knox, Kentucky. It remained there until July 1973, when it moved to the Lexington-Blue Grass Army Depot in Kentucky. In June 1993, it moved to Redstone Arsenal, Alabama. Paper production ended with the June 2017 issue; it is now in APP format only.

Department of the Army pamphlets 750-30 (about the M16 rifle) and 750-31 (about the Gama Goat) as well as numerous posters including 750-78 (about the role of enlisted leadership in preventative maintenance) were also produced in the style of PS, in some cases utilizing the same characters.

Characters
Master Sergeant Half-Mast and Connie Rodd (now a civilian) as well as Privates Dope and Fosgnoff were brought by Eisner from Army Motors. Dope and Fosgnoff served as cautionary tales while Half-Mast provided direct technical guidance. Following Army complaints about screw-ups Dope and Fosgnoff, both characters were permanently removed in 1955. As other combat support and combat service support elements joined the magazine, new characters were added to represent branch-specific issues: Bull Dozer for the engineers in 1954, Percy the Skunk for the Chemical Corps in 1960, Windy Windsock (and later Benjamin "Rotor" Blade) for aviation in 1962, and Macon Sparks for the signal corps in 1977. To better serve a diversifying demographic in the military audience, in 1970 an African-American civilian woman, Bonnie, was added. A Hispanic quartermaster sergeant, Pablo Hablo, was introduced in 1993 but was removed only five years later after being perceived as a racial stereotype. In 2001, On-Line Warrior was added to the PS line-up to communicate information about online resources.

From the 1950s to the 1970s, Connie and Bonnie were played up as "cheesecake" targeted at the mostly male GIs to help interest them in using PS. Following an increased presence of females in the Army and at the urging of Congresswoman Bella Abzug as well as Senators William Proxmire and Orrin Hatch, the magazine updated Connie and Bonnie in March 1980 to a more modest and professional form.

Sherry Steward has opined that the anthropomorphism of military equipment in the magazine helps the military audience "build serious relationships with technology... personified equipment often reflects emotions of anger, sadness, fear, and happiness to appeal to the reader's sense of responsibility." Through facial expressions, body language and dialogue, the anthropomorphized equipment reacts soldiers' activity, establishing empathy among those charged with maintenance of the Army's equipment.

Citations

References

External links

Army Motors online at the Virginia Military Preservation Association
Army Motors online at Radionerds.com
Online Archive of PS issues 1951-1971 at Virginia Commonwealth University Libraries
PS Magazine free and full archive downloadable under CC BY-NC-SA 3.0 license at Radionerds.com
PS Magazine archive at NSN Depot

1951 comics debuts
Comics magazines published in the United States
Monthly magazines published in the United States
United States Army publications
Comics by Will Eisner
Magazines established in 1951
War comics
Educational comics
Magazines published in Alabama
Military magazines published in the United States